Paying the Limit is a 1924 silent film melodrama directed by Tom Gibson and starring Ora Carew.

A print survives in the Library of Congress.

Cast 
 Ora Carew as Raffles
 Helen Nowell as Joan Lowden
 Eddie O'Brien as Thunder Lowden
 Arthur Wellington as Jerry Davis
 Jay Morley as Tom Dover
 Tiny Sandford as Ole
 Dick Stevens as Baptiste Tudor

References

External links 
 
 

1924 films
American silent feature films
Films directed by Frank Capra
1924 drama films
Silent American drama films
American black-and-white films
1920s American films